William Albert Bablitch (March 1, 1941February 16, 2011) was a politician, jurist, and lawyer from Wisconsin. He served in the Wisconsin State Senate from 1972 to 1983, and on the Wisconsin Supreme Court from 1983 to 2003.

Bablitch was born in Stevens Point, Wisconsin, and graduated from Pacelli High School in 1959. He studied at the University of Wisconsin–Stevens Point and received a bachelor's degree from the University of Wisconsin–Madison in 1963. He served in the Peace Corps for two years before earning a law degree from the University of Wisconsin Law School in 1968 and a master of laws degree in the appellate process from the University of Virginia School of Law in 1987. Bablitch was married to Wisconsin Court of Appeals Judge Martha Bablitch. They divorced in 1978.

Bablitch served as Portage County district attorney from 1969 to 1972 and served in the Wisconsin State Senate from 1972 to 1983 and was a Democrat. He was elected to the Wisconsin Supreme Court in 1983 and reelected in 1993. Bablitch retired at the end of his term July 31, 2003. He was a part-time partner at the law firm of Michael Best & Friedrich LLP in Madison. He died in Hawaii.

References

External links
 
 

1941 births
2011 deaths
People from Stevens Point, Wisconsin
Peace Corps volunteers
District attorneys in Wisconsin
Democratic Party Wisconsin state senators
Justices of the Wisconsin Supreme Court
University of Wisconsin Law School alumni
University of Wisconsin–Madison alumni
University of Virginia School of Law alumni
20th-century American judges